Silky swallow-wort is a common name for several plants and may refer to:

 Asclepias syriaca
 Asclepias tuberosa, native to eastern and southwestern North America